James Wade Hampton (July 9, 1936 – April 7, 2021) was an American actor, television director, and screenwriter. He is best known for his TV roles such as Private Hannibal Shirley Dobbs on F Troop (1965–1967), and Leroy B. Simpson on The Doris Day Show (1968–1969), Love, American Style (1969–1974), and his movie roles such as Caretaker in The Longest Yard (1974), Howard Clemmons in Hawmps! (1976), Harold Howard in Teen Wolf (1985), and Jerry Woolridge in Sling Blade (1996).

Early life
Hampton was born in Oklahoma City, Oklahoma, the son of Edna (Gately), who worked at a millinery, and Ivan Hampton, who ran a dry cleaning business. He was raised in Dallas, Texas, and majored in theatre arts at the University of North Texas in Denton. While attending UNT, he was a member of the Gamma Lambda chapter of Kappa Alpha Order.

After a series of failed jobs including bodyguard, bartender, and photojournalist, he was inducted into the United States Army.  He was stationed in Germany and performed with the USO, for which he won awards.

Career
Following his service, he performed in summer stock in Texas and then moved to New York City, where he was given his first film role - the Academy Award-nominated short subject The Cliffdwellers. 

Hampton's next role came as the lead character in a May 1963 Gunsmoke episode entitled "Jeb", featuring his friend and series regular Burt Reynolds. He returned to Gunsmoke later that year in "Pa Hack’s Brood" (S9E13), again as a character named Jeb, although Marshall Dillon makes no reference in this episode to the previous appearance.  He returned to Gunsmoke one more time as the title character (and hilarious cousin to Festus) in the 1965 episode “Eliab’s Aim”.

In 1964, Hampton was cast as publisher William Randolph Hearst in the episode "The Paper Dynasty" of the television series, Death Valley Days.

Hampton is known for his roles in CBS's The Doris Day Show (as Leroy, the handyman); ABC's F Troop (as Hannibal Dobbs the incompetent bugler); Robert Aldrich's The Longest Yard (1974); Attack on Terror: The FBI vs. the Ku Klux Klan (1975); Teen Wolf (1985); the Teen Wolf television series (1986 to 1989); Police Academy 5: Assignment Miami Beach (1988); and Sling Blade (1996). Hampton guest starred as Jim Rockford's cousin Aaron Ironwood in a 1975 episode of NBC's The Rockford Files. He received a HALO Award for Hawmps!, and a Golden Globe Award nomination for "Most Promising Newcomer" for the part of "Caretaker" in The Longest Yard. He was also the spokesman for the American Egg Board.

In 1980, he starred alongside Gary Collins in the low-budget movie Hangar 18.  It was filmed primarily in Big Spring, Texas, and the two played NASA astronauts trying to expose a UFO coverup.

In 2012, Hampton appeared in an advertisement on MeTV touting some of the shows in which he had guest starred, including Gomer Pyle, U.S.M.C. and The Rockford Files.

Personal life

Hampton married actress Mary Deese in 2002. 

He had three children – James, Andrea and Frank. They resided in Texas.

Death
He died of complications from Parkinson's disease on April 7, 2021, at his home in Fort Worth, Texas. He was 84.

Filmography

Awards and nominations

References

External links
 
 

1936 births
2021 deaths
American male film actors
American male television actors
American television directors
American male screenwriters
Neurological disease deaths in Texas
Deaths from Parkinson's disease
United States Army soldiers
Male actors from Oklahoma City
Military personnel from Oklahoma
University of North Texas alumni
Male actors from Los Angeles
Writers from Oklahoma City
Screenwriters from Oklahoma
Screenwriters from California